Cajigal may refer to:

12359 Cajigal, main belt asteroid with a perihelion of 2.6828106 AU
Francisco Cajigal de la Vega (born 1715), Spanish military officer, governor of Cuba from 1747 to 1760
Juan Manuel Cajigal (born 1754), Spanish Captain General born in Cádiz
Juan Manuel Cajigal Municipality, one of the 21 municipios that make up the eastern Venezuelan state of Anzoátegui
Juan Manuel Cajigal y Odoardo (1803–1856), Venezuelan mathematician, engineer and statesman